The Padma Bhushan is the third-highest civilian award of the Republic of India. Instituted on 2January 1954, the award is given for "distinguished service of a high order", without distinction of race, occupation, position, or sex. The recipients receive a Sanad, a certificate signed by the President of India and a circular-shaped medallion with no monetary association. The recipients are announced every year on Republic Day (26January) and registered in The Gazette of Indiaa publication used for official government notices and released weekly by the Department of Publication, under the Ministry of Urban Development. The conferral of the award is not considered official without its publication in the Gazette. The name of recipient, whose award have been revoked or restored, both of which require the authority of the President, is  archived and they are required to surrender their medal when their name is struck from the register; none of the conferments of Padma Bhushan during 1980–1989 have been revoked or restored. The recommendations are received from all the state and the union territory governments, as well as from Ministries of the Government of India, the Bharat Ratna and the Padma Vibhushan awardees, the Institutes of Excellence, the Ministers, the Chief Ministers and the Governors of State, and the Members of Parliament including private individuals.

When instituted in 1954, the Padma Bhushan was classified as "Dusra Varg" (Class II) under the three-tier Padma Vibhushan awards, which were preceded by the Bharat Ratna in hierarchy. On 15January 1955, the Padma Vibhushan was reclassified into three different awards as the Padma Vibhushan, the Padma Bhushan and the Padma Shri. The criteria included "distinguished service of a high order in any field including service rendered by Government servants", but excluded those working with the public sector undertakings with the exception of doctors and scientists. The 1954 statutes did not allow posthumous awards; this was subsequently modified in the January 1955 statute. The centrally placed pattern made of outer lines of a square of  side is embossed with a knob carved within each of the outer angles of the pattern. A raised circular space of diameter  is placed at the centre of the decoration. A centrally located lotus flower is embossed on the obverse side of the medal and the text "Padma" is placed above and the text "Bhushan" is placed below the lotus written in Devanagari script. The State Emblem of India is displayed in the centre of the reverse side, together with the national motto of India, "Satyameva Jayate" (Truth alone triumphs) in Devanagari script, which is inscribed on the lower edge. The rim, the edges and all embossing on either side is of standard gold with the text "Padma Bhushan" of gold gilt. The medal is suspended by a pink riband  in width with a broad white stripe in the middle. It is ranked fifth in the order of precedence of wearing of medals and decorations of the Indian civilian and military awards.

After assuming office as Prime Minister of India in 1977, Morarji Desai withdrew all the civilian awards, reckoning them as "worthless and politicized". As a result, the Padma Bhushan award was not conferred to any person from 1978 until 1980 when the suspension was rescinded on 25January by Indira Gandhi, Desai's predecessor who had returned to office. Cricketer Sunil Gavaskar became the first recipient of the award since its restoration in 1980; he was the only person awarded in that year.

A total of 133 awards were presented in the 1980s. Only one award was conferred in 1980 which was later followed by nine in 1981, fifteen in 1982, seventeen in both 1983 and 1984, twenty-one in 1985, fourteen in 1986, twelve in 1987, thirteen in 1988, and fourteen in 1989. The Padma Bhushan in the 1980s was also conferred upon ten foreign recipients four from the United Kingdom, three from the United States, and one each from Denmark, France, and Japan. Individuals from nine different fields were awarded, which includes twenty-eight from literature and education, twenty-five from civil services, twenty-three artists, nineteen from science and engineering, thirteen from medicine, ten from public affairs, eight from social work, four from trade and industry, and three from sportspersons. Pushpa Mittra Bhargava, scientist and founder-director of Centre for Cellular and Molecular Biology (CCMB) who had received the award in 1986 in the field of medicine, returned it in 2015 in protest of the Dadri mob lynching and out of concern at the "prevailing socio-politico situation" in the country.

Recipients

Explanatory notes

Foreign recipients

References

External links
 
 

Lists of Indian award winners